Dürrnberg, also named Bad Dürrnberg, is an Austrian village part of the municipality of Hallein, in Hallein District (Tennengau), Salzburg State. It is the location of the Hallein Salt Mine (Salzbergwerk Dürrnberg).

History
The history of Dürrnberg and its territory is closely related to the presence of salt on its mountains. Previously used as an allocation for nomadic hunters around 2000/2500 years b.C., was used by Celtic tribes around 600 BC.  For the important Celtic bronze flagon found there, now in the Keltenmuseum in Hallein, see Basse Yutz Flagons.

Geography
The village is located on a hillside upon Salzach river and under the Obersalzberg mountain range. It lies close to Austrian borders with Bavaria, Germany and nearest German village is Oberau, few km after the frontier. Dürrnberg is 4 km far from Hallein, 20 from Salzburg and 12 from the Bavarian town of Berchtesgaden.

Main sights
The Hallein Salt Mine, also known as Salzbergwerk Dürrnberg, is an underground salt mine located in the middle of the village. Opened for visitors in 1994, it hosts a museum and is receptive for tourism, as the other Austrian underground salt mines in Hallstatt and Altaussee.

Gallery

Celtic artefacts from Dürrnberg

See also
Bavarian-Austrian Salt Treaty

References

External links

Cities and towns in Hallein District
Austria–Germany border crossings